monochloride may refer to:

Aluminium monochloride, the metal halide with the formula AlCl
Bromine monochloride, also called bromine(I) chloride, bromochloride, and bromine chloride, BrCl
Iodine monochloride, the chemical compound with the formula ICl. It is a red-brown compound that melts near room temperature
Selenium monochloride, an inorganic compound with the formula Se2Cl2